Grand Plaza is a residential apartment building in Chicago, Illinois, United States. The 57 story building was completed in 2003 at a height of  when measured from its decorative spires. Grand Plaza I is one of the tallest all-residential buildings in Chicago and contains 481 luxury apartment units. Until July 1st, 2008, it was the tallest building in the Chicago ZIP Code 60610, the ZIP Code with the most high-rises in the city. On July 1st, 2008, the building ended up being in a new ZIP Code: 60654. That ZIP Code encompasses a small area, so the building is still the tallest in its ZIP Code.

Phase two of the Grand Plaza complex was The Residences at Grand Plaza, completed in the same year. At 39 floors, it is the shorter of the two twin towers and is now a condominium building.

Both buildings were designed by Loewenberg + Associates and OWP&P Architects. They also share a common base full of retail such as a Jewel-Osco supermarket.

See also
List of skyscrapers
List of tallest buildings in the United States
List of tallest buildings in Chicago
World's tallest structures

References
Official website

Apartment buildings in Chicago
Residential condominiums in Chicago
Residential skyscrapers in Chicago
Residential buildings completed in 2003
2003 establishments in Illinois